Dogtown is a 1997 American drama film by George Hickenlooper about life in the small town of Cuba, Missouri starring Mary Stuart Masterson, Jon Favreau, Rory Cochrane, Harold Russell, and Natasha Gregson Wagner.

Plot 
A failed actor returns to his small hometown, unaware that he has become a local celebrity. Taking advantage of his newfound fame, he attempts to impress an old unrequited crush who has fallen on hard times.

Cast 
 Trevor St. John as Phillip Van Horn, failed actor who returns to his hometown, had crush on Dorothy in high school
 Mary Stuart Masterson as Dorothy Sternen, former beauty queen, now an alcoholic and depressed hairdresser in off/on relationship with Ezra
 Jon Favreau as Ezra Good, racist bully from Phillip's past; off/on relationship with Dorothy
 Karen Black as Rose Van Horn, Phillip's mother who sings in a local band
 Harold Russell as Blessed William, a war veteran who runs the cigar store; Russell's final role before his death
 Natasha Gregson Wagner as Sara Ruth Van Horn, Phillip's sister and Rose's daughter who is mentally handicapped
 Rory Cochrane as Curtis Lasky, bully from Phillip's past; close friends with Ezra

Production 
The film was shot entirely in Torrance, California.  Hickenlooper intentionally tried to make Ezra Good, Jon Favreau's character, compelling and worthy of the audience's interest despite his racism. Shooting took 24 days.  Russell's part was written for him, though he had to be persuaded to take the role.

Release 
Dogtown premiered at the Los Angeles Independent Film Festival in April 1997.

Reception 
Todd McCarthy of Variety called it an "occasionally amusing" melodrama that pales in comparison to The Last Picture Show.

Awards 
1998 Hermosa Beach Film Festival:  Best Director (George Hickenlooper); Best Screenplay (George Hickenlooper); Best Actress (Karen Black)
1998 Newport Beach Film Festival: Best Director (George Hickenlooper)

References

External links 
 

1997 films
1997 drama films
Films directed by George Hickenlooper
American drama films
Films about actors
1990s English-language films
1990s American films
1997 independent films